Shree Dev Vyadeshwar temple is a temple dedicated to the God Shiva. The deity is considered as the Kuladevata (Clan-deity) of many Chitpavan families from the Konkan region.

Legend
Sage Parashurama created the land  of Konkan by shooting his arrow into the sea and commanding the Sea God to retract the waters to the point where his arrow landed. This new land came to be known as Sapta-Konkana, meaning "piece of earth", "corner of earth", or "piece of a corner", derived from Sanskrit words: koṇa (कोण, corner) + kaṇa (कण, piece).

Shree Parshurama also requested 60 rishis to settle in the newly created land and protect the resident clans. He, being a devotee of the God Shiva, requested Shree Shiva to meet him daily. Sage Vyadi installed the lingam of Shiva at this temple in Guhagar. The Shiva icon and temple was thus named as Shree Vyadeshwar (the Lord of Vyadi). It is believed that Shree Shiva stays here in the invisible form.

Shree Vyadeshwar Deity was lost to time and is rediscovered in the era of King Sakuran, when the current temple structure was constructed.

Style 

The architectural style is called 'Panchayatan'. A Panchayatan temple contains four subordinate shrines in four corners and the main shrine in the center of the podium, which forms the base. Here, Shiva is Shree Vyadeshwar, the central shrine, with Surya, Ganesha, Amba or Ambika (Shiva's consort) and Vishnu with his wife Lakshmi as the South-East, South-West, North-West and North-East subordinate shrines respectively. Nandi (the vahana of Shiva) sits in front of the main shrine.

The temple has three entrances to the east, west and south. Shri Garuda (the vahana of Vishnu) and Shri Hanuman are installed on either sides of the East entrance, inside the temple.

Updates
This 'Panchayatan' temple is ancient, as are its deities. Due to aging, the three shrines were found eroded. In May 2015, the shrines of Shri Parvati (Ambikamata), Shri Garud and Shri Hanuman were ceremonially replaced by new shrines. Also the shrine of Shri Suryanarayan was replaced later. All the required reinstatement rituals were systematically performed. The old entrance facing due East was small in size and was inconvenient. That entrance (Mahadwar in local Marathi language) was replaced with a completely renovated gate, during the recent renovation of the temple.

Incarnations of Shri Vyadeshwar
Three small pieces were separated from the main or core part of the Pindi. One piece was located at Borya Adoor; the second piece went to Asgoli and the third piece to Anjanwel. At these locations, new Shiva temples were erected. These temples are known as Talkeshwar, Balkeshwar (Valukeshwar)  and Udaleshwar (Uddalakeshwar)  respectively. These three Shiva Pindis are considered to be incarnations of Shri Vyadeshwar. The said locations being very close to Guhagar, devotees of Shri Vyadeshwar may visit these three temples also.

Nearby holy sites
Other holy places reflect the presence of different deities : Shree Chandikai Kalkai Temple (Waghivare),
Garamath, Velneshwar, Tarakeshwar, Taldeo, Kartikeya, Someshwar, Sapteshwar, Karneshwar, Karhateshwar, Kutakeshwar, Hrudakeshwar, Saptakotishwar, Dalbhyeshwar, Harihareshwar, Bhairav, Rameshwar, Chyavaneshwar, Ufrata Ganesh, Karanjeshwari Pethmap Chiplun and Durga Devi temple, Guhagar.

Shri Vyadeshwar Mantra and Aarti

In Sanskrit, the holy prayer for chanting is called a Mantra while a poem that describes specialties of the deity is called an Aarti. Shri Vyadeshwar Mantra  is given in adjacent picture while snap of Shri Vyadeshwar Aarti is given in gallery

Gallery
Following are the relevant photographs:

See also

 Velneshwar
 Parshurama
 Kashyap
 Harihareshwar

References

External links
Velavan Beach House -Coastal Homestay at Guhagar

Hindu temples in Maharashtra
Ratnagiri district
Shiva temples in Maharashtra
Articles containing video clips